BC Sukhumi is a professional basketball club from the city of Sukhumi, that plays in the Georgian Superliga. The club is currently based in Tbilisi.

History
The club was established in 1991 in Sukhumi. Shortly afterwards, the War in Abkhazia forced the team to leave their home city, and relocate to the Georgian capital. Nevertheless, they managed to complete the 1992-93 season, and have been playing in Tbilisi ever since.

The club has played under several names over the years ("Sukhumi-91," "Kolkha," "SSU" and, since 2009, as "Sukhumi"). Their best result in the league is 4th place, which they achieved in 2011 and 2012.

In 2011, Sukhumi represented Georgia in the EuroChallenge tournament, but failed to progress through the qualifying round.

For much of its existence, the team has been coached by Vazha Kvaratskhelia.

Players

Current roster

Notable players

 Nikoloz Tskitishvili

External links
Official website
fibaeurope.com Team Profile
Eurobasket.com team profile

Basketball teams in Georgia (country)
Sport in Sukhumi